Kennedy Ohene Agyapong (born June 16, 1960) is a Ghanaian politician and businessman who represents Assin Central in parliament for the New Patriotic Party. He was first elected a member of parliament in 2000 to the seat of Assin North. He retained his seat in the 2004 and 2008 parliamentary elections. In 2012 he was elected in the new seat of Assin Central and was re-elected in 2016. He also retained his seat in the 2020 general elections. He is currently the Chairman of the Parliament's Defense and Interior Committee.

Early life and education 
Ohene Agyapong was born 16 June 1960 and hails from Assin Dompim in the Central Region of Ghana. He had his secondary education at Adisadel College in the Central Region. Agyapong holds a GCE A Level and studied in the Fordham University, New York, USA. He is a farmer and businessman, director of Assin Farms, Supercare Group of Companies and Hollywood Shopping Centre. He is married with 22 children.

Politics
Kennedy Agyapong still remains one of the politicians who have never lost election. His intellectual work in the 2016 elections resulted in the victory of Nana Addo Dankwah Akufo- Addo. He also contributed immensely to the victory of most NPP parliamentary candidates- such as K.T Hammond and many more.

Kennedy Agyapong chairs the Communication Committee in Parliament, under the current presidency of Nana Akufo-Addo.
 
Agyapong has vowed to commit suicide if former President John Mahama's brother, Ibrahim, is not jailed by the Akufo-Addo government for some corrupt activities which, according to Agyapong, have led to the state losing money. One example he claimed, was the defaulting of payment of taxes by Ibrahim Mahama for more than a year period when his brother was President of the Republic of Ghana. Agyapong's personal campaign on the issue to bring it to media attention led to the investigation of Ibrahim Mahama and subsequent agreement of Ibrahim Mahama to pay the said taxes. This action earned Kennedy Agyapong praises from a wide section of Ghanaians.

Agyapong's indirect attack on the Electoral Commissioner of Ghana Charlotte Osei for, he alleged, trading sex for her position as the Electoral Commissioner (EC) boss brought upon him criticisms from various leaders including Queen mothers and human rights activists as well as other members of parliament. In 2018, following the arrest of Ghana Football Association president Kwasi Nyantakyi, he said that anti-corruption investigative journalist Anas Aremeyaw Anas should be stopped before he started investigating people in their "bedrooms whilst asleep". He has repeatedly threatened Anas and was condemned internationally by the committee to Protect Journalists  and Reporters Without Borders  he stated that Anas' methods were 'unfair'. Speaking live on Adom FM on 4 June 2018, he called Anas "a blackmailer, an extortionist", mimed his throat being cut and said he should be "hanged." He also called for "retribution" against Anas' fellow reporter, Ahmed Hussein-Suale, saying "If he comes here, beat him... Whatever happens, I'll pay." Hussein-Suale was subsequently assassinated.

In July 2018, he was cross examined for contempt of Parliament.

He is believed to be the first Ghanaian individual to own an ¢8 million Rolls-Royce, and is believed to also own a private jet, sparking calls for an investigation from the Customs Excise and Preventive Service into his wealth.

Committees 
He is the Chairperson for the Defense and Interior Committee; also, a member of the Judiciary Committee and also a member of the Special Budget Committee.

Personal life 
He is a Christian.

See also
Who Watches the Watchman exposé
Number 12 exposé
Net2TVGh

References

19.ʌ "Kennedy Agyapong admits that he almost died last month. legitloaded.com. Retrieved 21 July 2020.

Living people
1960 births
People from Central Region (Ghana)
Ghanaian MPs 2017–2021
Fordham University alumni
Ghanaian agriculturalists
Ghanaian businesspeople
Ghanaian MPs 2001–2005
Ghanaian MPs 2005–2009
Ghanaian MPs 2009–2013
Ghanaian MPs 2013–2017
Ghanaian MPs 2021–2025